Louis Laurent Bertignac (born 23 February 1954) is a French guitarist, vocalist and songwriter. An ex Shakin' Street member and a founding member in 1976 of the rock band Téléphone, he formed Bertignac et les Visiteurs after Téléphone split in 1986. Tony Visconti produced his first solo album, Elle et Louis (1993) and Chris Kimsey the second,  '96.

In 2004, he produced, arranged and played guitar on the debut album by Carla Bruni, Quelqu'un m'a dit. Bruni in turn contributed lyrics to 10 of the 12 songs on Bertignac's 2005 album Longtemps.

He performed at Live 8 at the Palace of Versailles on 2 July 2005. He appears as an actor in Highlander III: The Sorcerer in 1994.

Discography

With Téléphone 

 Téléphone (1977)
 Crache Ton Venin (1979)
 Téléphone public (1980)
 Au Cœur de la Nuit (1980)
 Dure Limite (1982)
 Un autre monde (1984)
 Téléphone Le Live (1986)
 Paris '81 (2000)

Bertignac et les Visiteurs 

Louis Bertignac et les Visiteurs (1987)
Rocks (1990)

Solo 

 Elle et Louis (1993)
 Le Médiator (live) (1993)
 '96 (1996)
 Bertignac live (live) (1998)
 Longtemps (2005)
 Live Power Trio (2006)
 Suis-moi (2014)

References

External links 
 Official website
 Louis Bertignac au festival Guitare en scène à Saint-Julien-en-Genevois – vidéo

1954 births
Living people
People from Oran
Pieds-Noirs
French singer-songwriters
French male singers
French rock guitarists
French male guitarists
French male singer-songwriters